The North American Soccer League was the second division of professional soccer in the United States from 2011 to 2017. Each season consisted of 7–12 teams and also included clubs from Canada and Puerto Rico.

List of seasons
The following is a list of all NASL seasons. It contains the number of teams, the number of regular-season games played per team, the champion—winner of the NASL Soccer Bowl, the winners of the regular-season (North American Supporters' Trophy), starting in 2013 the winner of the Spring and a Fall seasons, the winner of the Most Valuable Player Award (MVP), the top scorer(s)—winner of the Golden Boot, and the regular-season average attendance.

See also
List of American and Canadian soccer champions

References